Miers Fisher Longstreth (March 15, 1819 - December 27, 1891) was an American merchant, physician, and astronomer, best known as a founding member of the National Academy of Sciences.

Longstreth was born in Philadelphia and received his secondary education at Clermont Academy
(graduating 1833), then M.L. Hurlburt's Classical Academy. He left school to work in a
hardware store, becoming a full member of the firm in 1840. As early as 1837, however, he was attending
lectures at the College of Pharmacy of the University of Pennsylvania. In 1856 he completed a
medical degree at the university's Medical Department.

By happenstance, a new Friends School was established next to his and his wife's home. The school
had an astronomical observatory, which Dr. Longstreth was invited to use. He soon came to own a
5-inch aperture telescope, a transit instrument, and an astronomical clock. With these instruments,
he discovered a discrepancy in the then-accepted formulas for the position of the Moon and
improved upon them as "Longstreth's Lunar Formula", so-named by Benjamin Peirce and put
to immediate use in the American Nautical Almanac.

Longstreth was elected a member of the American Philosophical Society in 1848,
and was a founding member of the National Academy of Sciences in 1863. Throughout his life
he was a devoted member of the Society of Friends.

References

19th-century American scientists
19th-century American physicians
19th-century American astronomers
United States National Academy of Sciences
University of Pennsylvania alumni